Piet Hein Eek is a Dutch designer. He is known for designs which require significant time from craftspeople, despite using very inexpensive, found materials.

Work 
Piet Hein Eek's work has an ecological focus. His emphasis on using found materials is in service of a sustainable design practice. His designs often bring out natural qualities of his materials, giving his pieces a distinctive look.

He has undertaken projects in sustainability in developing countries, as well as furniture design and production projects in his native the Netherlands. In 2018, he developed a furniture line in collaboration with IKEA.

References 

1967 births
Living people
Dutch designers